Aadavaallu Meeku Joharlu is a 1981 Indian Telugu-language film directed by K. Balachander, starring Krishnam Raju, Jayasudha and Bhanu Chander, with Chiranjeevi playing a guest role towards the climax.

Plot

Cast 
Krishnam Raju as Narsimha
Jayasudha as P. Rani
Bhanu Chander
Saritha as Papayamma
Chiranjeevi (Cameo)
Y. Vijaya
Jayamalini
Tyagaraju
Sakshi Rangarao as teacher
Prasad Rao
Krishna Chaitanya
Master Raju
Shyamala
Lakshmi Chitra
Asha Lata
Raghavan
Bharat Kumar
Jit Mohan Mitra
Basha

Soundtrack 
Soundtrack was composed by K. V. Mahadevan.

References

External links 
 

1980s Telugu-language films
1981 films
Films directed by K. Balachander
Films scored by K. V. Mahadevan
Films with screenplays by K. Balachander
Indian romantic drama films
Matricide in fiction
Sailing films